Maurice Exslager (born 12 February 1991) is a German footballer who plays as a forward for SC Frintrop 05/21.

Club career

Exslager made his senior debut on 24 April 2010 in a 2. Bundesliga match for MSV Duisburg against SC Paderborn.

In June 2013, he moved to 2. Bundesliga club 1. FC Köln. On 23 June 2014, Exslager was loaned to newly promoted 2. Bundesliga side Darmstadt 98 for a year.

References

External links
 
 
 Maurice Exslager at Fupa

1991 births
Living people
People from Bocholt, Germany
Sportspeople from Münster (region)
German footballers
Germany youth international footballers
Association football forwards
MSV Duisburg players
1. FC Köln players
1. FC Köln II players
1. FC Magdeburg players
SV Darmstadt 98 players
SC Fortuna Köln players
1. FC Bocholt players
2. Bundesliga players
3. Liga players
Regionalliga players
Footballers from North Rhine-Westphalia